Edmilson Gabriel Dove (born 18 July 1994) is a Mozambican professional footballer who plays for South African club Kaizer Chiefs and the Mozambique national team. He primarily plays as a defender, but has also played as a midfielder.

Club career
Hailing from the town of Tavene in the Gaza Province, Dove played with various youth teams before arriving at Ferroviário de Maputo in 2013. He made his debut with the first team during the 2015 season, winning a league title in his first year.

In May 2016, Dove traveled to Lisbon to undergo a trial with Portuguese club Sporting CP.

In January 2017, he was signed by South African Premier Division club Cape Town City to provide defensive depth after the exit of Aubrey Modiba, their first-choice left-back. Dove initially caught their attention after an international friendly between Mozambique and South Africa that past November. He made his professional debut on 7 February, during a 3-0 victory over Highlands Park. In just his fourth appearance with the team, a win over Baroka, he was named man of the match after providing an assist to Sibusiso Masina. The Star described his play by saying that "in just four games, he's taken the ABSA Premiership by storm."

International career
Dove was first called up to the Mozambique national team for the 2015 COSAFA Cup, making his debut in their quarter-finals victory over Malawi. His team finished as tournament runners-up, with Dove playing the full 90 minutes in the final against Namibia.

He earned four caps for Mozambique during the 2016 African Nations Championship qualification, playing in both legs against Seychelles and Zambia before Mozambique got knocked out of the tournament.

Dove was also called up to the national team for the 2017 Africa Cup of Nations qualifiers, appearing in three games in Group H before Mozambique was eliminated.

Career statistics

International

Honours

Club
Ferroviário de Maputo
Moçambola: 2015

Cape Town City
MTN 8: 2018

International
Mozambique
 COSAFA Cup: 2015 runners-up

References

External links

 
 
 
 
 Ferroviário de Maputo profile

1994 births
Living people
People from Gaza Province
Mozambican footballers
Mozambique international footballers
Association football defenders
Association football midfielders
Clube Ferroviário de Maputo footballers
Cape Town City F.C. (2016) players
Kaizer Chiefs F.C. players
Moçambola players
South African Premier Division players
Mozambican expatriate footballers
Mozambican expatriate sportspeople in South Africa
Expatriate soccer players in South Africa